The 2014 Vodacom Cup was played between 7 March and 16 May 2014 and was the 17th edition of this annual domestic cup competition.

Competition

There were sixteen teams participating in the 2014 Vodacom Cup competition. These teams were geographically divided into two sections, with eight teams in each section. Teams played all the teams in their section once over the course of the season, either at home or away.

Teams received four log points for a win and two points for a draw. Bonus log points were awarded to teams that scored four or more tries in a game, as well as to teams that lost a match by seven points or less. Teams were ranked by log points, then points difference (points scored less points conceded).

The top four teams in each section qualified for the title play-offs. In the quarter finals, the teams that finished first in each section had home advantage against the teams that finished fourth in the other section and the teams that finished second in each section had home advantage against the teams that finished third in the other section. The winners of these quarter finals then played each other in the semi-finals, with the higher-placed team having home advantage. The two semi-final winners then met in the final.

Quotas

This competition saw the reintroduction of a quota system. Each match-day squad had to contain seven black players. Two of these had to be forwards and five of these had to be in the starting line-up.

Teams

Changes from 2013
 The  withdrew from the competition due to financial considerations.
 Despite not being included in the preliminary fixtures released by SARU, the Kenya Rugby Union confirmed that they would compete in the competition, where they will play in the Southern Section and be based in Cape Town. That announcement followed months of Kenyan media sources reporting that they would play in the competition  pending clearance by the IRB, which was subsequently attained.

Team Listing

The following teams took part in the 2014 Vodacom Cup competition:

Logs

The final standings in the pool stages of the 2014 Vodacom Cup were as follows:

Northern Section

Southern Section

Fixtures and results
The following fixtures were released:

Northern Section

Round one

Round two

Round three

Round four

Round Five

Round Six

Round Seven

Southern Section

Round one

Round two

Round three

Round four

Round Five

Round Six

Round Seven

Quarter-finals

Semi-finals

Final

Winners

Players

Player statistics

The following table contain points which were scored during the 2014 Vodacom Cup season:

See also

 Vodacom Cup
 2014 Currie Cup Premier Division
 2014 Currie Cup First Division
 2014 Currie Cup qualification

External links

References

Vodacom Cup
2014 in South African rugby union
2014 rugby union tournaments for clubs